The tennis competition at the 2022 Pacific Mini Games was held from 16 to 24 June 2022 at the American Memorial Park and Pacific Islands Club in Saipan, Northern Mariana Islands. Tennis was one of only two sports on the 2022 mini games program that began a day earlier from the official opening ceremony of the games.

Competition schedule

Participating nations
As of 1 June 2022, sixteen countries and territories have confirmed their participation in the games. Each Pacific Games association is allowed to enter a maximum of eight athletes, with no more than five of the same gender.

Medal summary

Medal table

Medal events

References

2022 Pacific Mini Games
Tennis at the Pacific Games
2022 in tennis